Old Burial Ground may refer to:

 Old Burial Ground, Royal Hospital Chelsea
 Old Burying Ground (Cambridge, Massachusetts)
 Putney Old Burial Ground
 Sydney Town Hall, also known as the Old Burial Ground